Narzotto dalle Carceri was the ruler of the southern , or third, of the Lordship of Negroponte in Frankish Greece from 1247 to 1264. He married Felisa, a daughter of William I of Verona.

References

Sources 

13th century in Greece
Triarchs of Negroponte
Narzotto